The 1996 Mid-Continent Conference men's basketball tournament was held March 3–5, 1996, at The MARK of the Quad Cities in Moline, Illinois.
This was the 13th edition of the tournament for the Association of Mid-Continent Universities/Mid-Continent Conference, now known as the Summit League.

Bracket

References 

Summit League men's basketball tournament
1995–96 Mid-Continent Conference men's basketball season
1996 in sports in Illinois